XHSO-FM is a radio station on 99.9 FM in León, Guanajuato. The station is owned by MVS Radio and carries its La Mejor grupera format.

History
XHSO received its first concession on April 25, 1969. It has always been owned by MVS through several different concessionaires.

References

Radio stations in Guanajuato
Radio stations established in 1969
MVS Radio